Ubiquitin-protein ligase E3C is an enzyme that in humans is encoded by the UBE3C gene.

References

Further reading